God's Trombones: Seven Negro Sermons in Verse is a 1927 book of poems by James Weldon Johnson patterned after traditional African-American religious oratory. African-American scholars Henry Louis Gates and Cornel West have identified the collection as one of Johnson's two most notable works, the other being Autobiography of an Ex-Colored Man.

Origins
Johnson observed an absence of attention in folklore studies to what he called a "folk sermon," then went on to describe its nature and specific examples from his memory:

Johnson explains the title's use of the trombone by discussing the vocal and rhetorical qualities of a preacher he had recently heard who, he felt, exemplified the compelling and persuasive nature of the folk preacher, naming the trombone as "the instrument possessing above all others the power to express the wide and varied range of emotions encompassed by the human voice — and with greater amplitude."  He also cited a dictionary definition that noted the trombone as being the brass instrument most resembling the range and sound of the human voice.

The seven poems were composed primarily in 1926, with "Go Down[,] Death" being composed in the space of a single afternoon on Thanksgiving Day, 1926, and the remaining five poems during a two-week retreat; "The Creation," the first poem of the set, had been composed about 1919.

Reception
The work went on to find acclaim in many circles, proving "enormously popular among both the black cognoscenti as well of the masses of black Americans" and being used widely in oratorical contests; poet Owen Dodson wrote Johnson in 1932 to tell him that Dodson and his brother had taken first and second place in a poetry-recitation competition with works from that volume.

Gates and West particularly note that the work "attempts a mimetic capturing of the black church sermon... without making recourse to the misspellings and orthographic tricks often employed in representing black vernacular speech."  Dorothy Canfield Fisher, in a personal letter to the poet to thank him and offer to help promote the collection, praised the work as "heart-shakingly beautiful and original, with the peculiar piercing tenderness and intimacy which seems to me special gifts of the Negro. ...it is a profound satisfaction to find those special qualities so exquisitely expressed."

The poem "The Creation" was used in the 1951 film Five, serving as the soliloquy for the character Charles, played by African-American actor Charles Lampkin. Lampkin convinced film-maker Arch Oboler to include excerpts of the poem in the final script of Five where it would become Lampkin's soliloquy for his character Charles. This may be the first time that audiences in the USA, Latin America, and Europe were exposed to African-American poetry, albeit not identified as such in the film.

Poems
The book comprises eight poems:
"Listen, Lord — A Prayer" – an invocation
"The Creation" – A narrative retelling of the creation of human as told in the Bible. Instead of being a distant force, the Creator character is imbued with personality and speaks in familiar language.
"The Prodigal Son" – from the biblical parable of the prodigal son
"Go Down Death — A Funeral Sermon" – in which Jesus is depicted as sending his servant, Death, to bring to heaven a weary woman who is old and ready to die, so that she can rest
"Noah Built the Ark" – retelling the biblical stories of Adam and Eve, a story of how sin entered the world, and of Noah and the Great Flood sent to cleanse the earth
"The Crucifixion" – telling the story of Jesus' crucifixion
 "Let My People Go" – telling the biblical story of Moses and his work freeing the Hebrew slaves from Egypt, which has often been the basis of comparisons to the African-American slavery experience in the United States
 "The Judgment Day" – the prophetic story of the Apocalypse

Notes

Bibliography
 .
 .
 .

External links
 .
 

American poetry collections
1927 books
1927 poems
Works by James Weldon Johnson
African-American poetry